The Pozas Formation is a geologic formation in Puerto Rico. It preserves fossils dating back to the Cretaceous period.

See also
 List of fossiliferous stratigraphic units in Puerto Rico

References

 

Cretaceous Puerto Rico
Puerto Rico articles missing geocoordinate data